Pulliman is a 2010 Indian Malayalam-language drama film written and directed by Anil K. Nair. The film stars Kalabhavan Mani and Meera Nandan in the lead roles. The music for the film was composed by Sharreth.

Plot 

Kunjunni is a youngster in Perimannur village who is loved by all. Radha belongs to a nadodi gang, who has come to the village to sell statuettes of Lord Krishna. Kunjunni and Radha are in love. Radha's father forbids her to marry the orphan. Kunjunni later finds out that he actually belongs to a rich family and he had left home some twenty years back, as his mother was a bit too strict.

Cast

Soundtrack
The music for the film was composed by Sharreth and songs were released by Satyam Audios on 9 April 2010.

References

External links

2010 films
2010s Malayalam-language films
Indian drama films
Films shot in Kollam
Films scored by Sharreth